Nasir Ali (born 30 January 1994) is a Pakistani cricketer. He made his first-class debut for Lahore Whites in the 2016–17 Quaid-e-Azam Trophy on 15 October 2016.

References

External links
 

1994 births
Living people
Pakistani cricketers
Lahore Whites cricketers
Cricketers from Lahore